The Tagale are a sub-ethnic group of the Nuba peoples in the Nuba Mountains of South Kordofan state, in southern Sudan.

They speak Tegali of the Kordofanian languages group, in the major  Niger–Congo language family.

They number several 10,000. Most of them are Muslims.

See also
Index: Nuba peoples

References
Joshua Project

Nuba peoples
Ethnic groups in Sudan